Sowmeeh-ye Kuchak (also Romanized as Şowme‘eh-ye Kūchak; also known as Şowma‘eh-ye Pā’īn) is a village in Qalandarabad Rural District, Qalandarabad District, Fariman County, Razavi Khorasan Province, Iran. At the 2006 census, its population was 53, in 11 families.

References 

Populated places in Fariman County